Waltrop ( is a town in the district of Recklinghausen, in North Rhine-Westphalia, Germany. It is situated on the Datteln-Hamm Canal, approximately 15 km east of Recklinghausen and 15 km north-west of Dortmund.

Division of the town
The town of Waltrop is surrounded by the Bauerschaften (rural boroughs) Lippe (Unterlippe/Oberlippe), Elmenhorst, Brockenscheidt, Leveringhausen, Oberwiese and Holthausen.

History
People already settled in this area about 2,000 years ago.

The village developed around the parish church of St. Peter which was built in the 9th/10th century.
It is known that in 1432 Waltrop was a part of the county Dortmund. After the Soest Feud,  the archbishops of Cologne could intervene against the counts of Mark, so that Waltrop became a part of Vest Recklinghausen.

The production of coal in the mine started in 1905. As a consequence, Waltrop grew larger and became an industrial town. The coal mine was closed down in 1974.

In 1939, Waltrop got its municipal rights.

Governance

The town council of Waltrop consists of 36 seats, which are divided into 6 parliamentary groups since September 2020:
SPD, 13 seats
CDU, 12 seats
Greens, 5 seats
Waltroper Aufbruch (WA), 3 seats
FDP, 2 seats
Die Linke, 1 seat

Since 2020 Marcel Mittelbach (SPD) is mayor of Waltrop.

Notable places
Waltrop is home to a museum of old ship lifts, including the Henrichenburg boat lift and a historical coal mine.

Local industry

Manufactum, upscale retailer for traditionally-made household goods
Langendorf, a tipping trailer manufacturer

Notable people 

 Sylvia Dördelmann (born 1970), rower
 Matthias Hues (born 1959), actor and martial artist
 Christoph Korte (born 1965), rower
 Michel Lewandowski (1914–1990), footballer
 Alexander Baumjohann (born 1987),  footballer

Twin towns – sister cities

Waltrop is twinned with:
 Herne Bay, England, United Kingdom (1976)
 Cesson-Sévigné, France (1984)
 San Miguelito, Nicaragua (1988)
 Gardelegen, Germany (1990)
 Görele, Turkey (2012)

References

External links
  

Towns in North Rhine-Westphalia
Recklinghausen (district)